The Riley 16 hp is a car made by the British Riley company from 1937 to 1940. It slotted into Riley's range immediately below their 18 hp V8 model. Announced in September 1937 for the Earls Court Motor Show it became one of the two genuine Riley models in the rationalised range that followed the 1938 takeover by the Nuffield Organization.

It had a 2443cc straight-four engine with twin cams and S.U carburettor which developed . The transmission was  a four speed manual. The chassis was a lengthened version of the one used on the Riley 12 hp which was introduced at the same time.

The 1939/40 16 hp was available with a standard saloon, Kestrel fastback saloon or drophead coupe coachwork.

Michael Sedgwick described this long-stroke four as a first-class tourer in the Riley tradition, Britain's largest four since the 4½-lire Bentley ended production in 1931. Its chassis he said was regular Riley - beam axles and Girling brakes - fitted with Borg-Warner overdrive as standard it would run up to 90 mph. The engine ran very smoothly for a four-cylinder. Good value for money it survived into Riley's Nuffield-owned era but with disc wheels, umbrella handbrake lever and ordinary synchromesh gearboxes, (Nuffield)  ". . . made a few wire-wheeled Kestrels in 1939 and 1940 to keep the traditionalists happy".

References

External links
 1940 Riley 16 with disc wheels

16
1930s cars
1940s cars
Rear-wheel-drive vehicles
Executive cars
Sedans
Convertibles